Paul Joseph “Tiny” Engebretsen (July 27, 1910 – March 31, 1979) was a professional American football player who played offensive lineman for two seasons for the Chicago Bears, Chicago Cardinals, and Pittsburgh Pirates, and 9 years for the Green Bay Packers.

Paul J. Engebretsen was born in Chariton, a town in Lucas County, Iowa to Henry J. Engebretsen (1880–1974) and Frankie Ophelia Kridelbaugh (1881–1972). He was named most valuable player of the Big Ten co-champion in 1931 playing at Northwestern University. Engebretsen had a large presence in his 1932 rookie season with the Chicago Bears, starting at guard and leading the NFL in extra points (10) and attempts (15).  He was acquired in a trade with the Brooklyn Dodgers in 1934 and played for nine years in Green Bay.

He was an all-league choice on the 1936 and 1939 champion Packer teams, topped the NFL in extra points (18) in 1939 and retired on September 16, 1941, two days after the season opener. In the NFL, Engebretsen scored 100 points on 15 of 28 field-goal tries and 55 of 62 extra-point attempts.  After retiring, he became a Packer scout. In 1941, he coached the Buffalo Tigers of the third American Football League. Engebretsen was inducted into the Green Bay Packers Hall of Fame in 1978

References

1910 births
1979 deaths
American football guards
American football tackles
Brooklyn Dodgers (NFL) players
Chicago Bears players
Chicago Cardinals players
Green Bay Packers players
Northwestern Wildcats football players
Pittsburgh Pirates (football) players
People from Chariton, Iowa
Players of American football from Iowa
American people of Norwegian descent